X-linked retinitis pigmentosa GTPase regulator is a GTPase-binding protein that in humans is encoded by the RPGR gene. The gene is located on the X-chromosome and is commonly associated with X-linked retinitis pigmentosa (XLRP). In photoreceptor cells, RPGR is localized in the connecting cilium which connects the protein-synthesizing inner segment to the photosensitive outer segment and is involved in the modulation of cargo trafficked between the two segments.

Function 

This gene encodes a protein with a series of six RCC1-like domains (RLDs), characteristic of the highly conserved guanine nucleotide exchange factors. Mutations in this gene have been associated with X-linked retinitis pigmentosa (XLRP). Multiple alternatively spliced transcript variants that encode different isoforms of this gene have been reported, but the full-length natures of only some have been determined.

The two major isoforms are RPGRconst, the default isoform, composed of exons 1-19, and RPGRORF15 which retains part of intron 15 as the terminal exon. ORF15 is the terminal exon of RPGRORF15 and is a mutational hotspot accounting for ~60% of RPGR patients with heterogeneous diseases ranging from XLRP to cone-rod degeneration and macular degeneration. Alternatively, the RPGRconst isoform contains a putative prenylation domain on its C-terminal end which is involved in posttranslational modification and allows membrane-association and protein trafficking. The C-terminal domain of the RPGRconst isoform contains a CTIL motif (812CTIL815) which recruits prenyl-binding protein PDE6D which then shuttles the protein to the connecting cilium.

Photoreceptor cells contain an inner segment and an outer segment which are joined by a connecting cilium. Protein synthesis occurs exclusively in the inner segment and all proteins must be trafficked across the connecting cilium to the outer segment where the phototransduction cascade takes place. RPGR is primarily located in a protein complex in the connecting cilium and is involved in regulating the cargo that is trafficked from the inner segment to the outer segment.

Interactions 

Retinitis pigmentosa GTPase regulator has been shown to interact with PDE6D nephronophthisis (NPHP) proteins and RPGRIP1. Binding to PDE6D has been shown to ensure ciliary localization of the RPGRconst isoform. Additionally, the N-terminal of interacts with a PDE6D interacting proetin, INPP5E (inositol polyphosphatase 5E). INPP5E has been shown to regulates phosphoinositide metabolism and may modulate the phosphoinositide content of photoreceptor cells.

RPGR has also been shown to preferentially interact with the GDP-bound form of the small GTPase RAB8A. RAB8A is involved in rhodopsin trafficking in primary cilia. The C-terminal domain of RPGRORF15 has been shown to interact with whirlin, a ciliary protein that is mutated in Usher Syndrome. The RPGRORF15 isoform has been shown to be glutamylated on its N-terminus by tubulin-tyrosine ligase-like 5 (TTLL5). It has also been shown that loss of TTLL5 mimics loss of RPGR in the mouse retina.

See also
X-linked cone-rod dystrophy, type 1

References

Further reading